For Love of an Enemy is a one-reel 1911 American motion picture produced by Kalem Company and directed by Sidney Olcott. A war story detailing the adventures and the love affair of a Union spy in the Confederate lines.

Cast
 Jack J. Clark - Confederate Spy
 Gene Gauntier - Hallie Coburn
 JP McGowan -

Production notes
The film was shot at Jacksonville Fla.

A copy is kept in the Desmet collection at Eye Film Institute (Amsterdam)

Bibliography
The Bioscope, 1911, February.
 The Film Index, Vol VII, n°1, p 1; p 21; p 24.
 The Moving Picture World, Vol 8, p 97; p 144.
 The New York Dramatic Mirror, 1911, January 18, p 30.

References

External links

 For Love of an Enemy website dedicated to Sidney Olcott
Film at YouTube

1911 films
Silent American drama films
American silent short films
Works about the American Civil War
Films shot in Jacksonville, Florida
Films directed by Sidney Olcott
1911 short films
1911 drama films
American black-and-white films
1910s American films